Cheektowaga-Sloan Union Free School District is a school district in Sloan, New York, United States. The superintendent is Mrs. Andrea Galenski.

The district operates four schools: John F. Kennedy High School, John F. Kennedy Middle School, Woodrow Wilson Elementary School, and Theodore Roosevelt Elementary School.

Administration 
The District offices are located 166 Halsted Avenue in Sloan. The current Superintendent is Andrea Galenski.

District history

Selected former superintendents 
Previous assignment and reason for departure denoted in parentheses
J. Ernest Wilson–1928-1953 (unknown, retired)
Leon A. Kaminski–1953-1969 (Principal - Theodore Roosevelt Elementary School, retired)
Joseph S. Gizinski–1969-1981 (unknown, retired)
James P. Mazgajewski–1981-2012 (Admissions Recruiter - Canisius College, retired)

John F. Kennedy High School 

John F. Kennedy Senior High School (formerly Sloan High School) is located at 305 Cayuga Creek Road and serves grades 9 through 12. The current principal is Robert Julian.

History 
John F. Kennedy High School was constructed in 1962. It would later be named for President John F. Kennedy, the first school to do so. Until 1997, the middle school grades were housed in the high school until the district formed the new middle school.

John F. Kennedy Middle School 

John F. Kennedy Middle School is located at 305 Cayuga Creek Road and serves grades 6 through 8. The current acting principal is Robert Julian.

History 
JFK Middle School was formed in 1997. Previously, the middle school grades were housed at John F. Kennedy High School. The school building was reconstructed to house the new middle school.

Woodrow Wilson Elementary School 

Woodrow Wilson Elementary School is located at 166 Halsted Avenue and serves grades 3 through 5. The current principal is Elizabeth Zaccarine.

Theodore Roosevelt Elementary 

Theodore Roosevelt Elementary School is located at 2495 William Street and serves grades K through 2. The current principal is Jeffrey Mochrie.

References

External links
Official site

Education in Erie County, New York
School districts in New York (state)